Tokyo Joe is a 1978 album by Ryuichi Sakamoto and guitarist Kazumi Watanabe. It is a compilation of tracks from the albums Thousand Knives (1978), Kylyn (1979), Kylyn Live (1979) and the track "Tokyo Joe" which appeared on a various artists anthology Tokyo-Paris-London-New York, Dancing Night. 
The album was originally released in Japan in 1978, then re-released also in the Western countries in the 1980s.

Track listing
 "Tokyo Joe" (Bryan Ferry)
 "The End of Asia" (Ryuichi Sakamoto)
 "Zai Gvang Dong Shoo Nian" (Akiko Yano)
 "I'll Be There" (Akiko Yano, Ryuichi Sakamoto)
 "E-Day Project" (Ryuichi Sakamoto)
 "Thousand Knives" (Ryuichi Sakamoto)
 "The River Must Flow" (Gino Vannelli)
 "Akasaka Moon" (Kazumi Watanabe)

Personnel
Ryuichi Sakamoto - keyboards, drums, marimba,
Kazumi Watanabe - guitar, bass, vocals
Akiko Yano - keyboards, electric piano, vocals, synthesizer
Ray J. O'Hara - bass
Haruomi Hosono - cymbal
Shigeharu Mukai - trombone
Shuichi Murakami - drums
Toshiyuki Honda - saxophones 
Yukihiro Takahashi - drums, vocals
Motoya Hamaguchi - drums
Shigeya Hamaguchi - percussion
Yasuaki Shimizu - tenor saxophone
Ohno Ensemble - strings
Hideki Matsutake - synthesizer

External links 
 

1978 compilation albums
Ryuichi Sakamoto albums